Chinese folk flute music are folk songs written to tell the traditions and tales of various tribes in China, around the 12th century. They were played mostly on wooden flutes, and thus the pieces that have survived till today are written in D, which is the key these early flutes were made in. This is also why, unlike most Chinese music, these pieces are not written in a pentatonic scale, but in a more middle eastern style. We can tell this because the ornamentation of these pieces is very similar to that of the bagpipes, which were invented in India, and also the penny whistle and other Celtic instruments.

These pieces were highly ornamented. Grace notes are used instead of tonguing, a technique used by the bagpipes. Unlike in most western music, any two notes were used as grace notes, rather than a tone gap.
These pieces were written by taking a short theme and developing it in three sections, each section adding more complex ornaments and rhythms as it progresses. Unlike the European folk structure which normally goes ABABAB etc., as in modern pop music, Chinese folk songs have a structure of AAA, or if you count the development as a change then: ABC.

See also
List of Chinese folk songs

References

Chinese folk music
Flutes